Parandaman Thamaraikannan (born 2 October 1992) is an Indian cricketer. He made his Twenty20 debut for Puducherry in the 2018–19 Syed Mushtaq Ali Trophy on 21 February 2019. He made his first-class debut on 4 February 2020, for Puducherry in the 2019–20 Ranji Trophy. He made his List A debut on 23 February 2021, for Puducherry in the 2020–21 Vijay Hazare Trophy.

References

External links
 

1992 births
Living people
Indian cricketers
Pondicherry cricketers
Place of birth missing (living people)